The Omni-American Book Club is a studio album by the Brian Lynch Big Band and produced by Kabir Sehgal and Doug Davis. The album received a Grammy Award for Best Large Jazz Ensemble Album at the 62nd Annual Grammy Awards.

References

2019 albums
Brian Lynch (musician) albums
Grammy Award for Best Large Jazz Ensemble Album